The 1989 British Grand Prix (formally the XLII Shell British Grand Prix) was a Formula One motor race held at Silverstone on 16 July 1989. It was the eighth race of the 1989 Formula One World Championship.

The 64-lap race was won by Frenchman Alain Prost, driving a McLaren-Honda, after he started from second position. Prost's Brazilian teammate, Ayrton Senna, took pole position and led until he spun off on lap 12. Local driver Nigel Mansell finished second in a Ferrari, with Italian Alessandro Nannini third in a Benetton-Ford. This marked the last win for a Honda powered car at Silverstone until Max Verstappen won the 70th Anniversary Grand Prix in 2020.

Qualifying

Pre-qualifying report
For the second Grand Prix in a row, the Onyx of Bertrand Gachot topped the time sheets in Friday morning's pre-qualifying session. It was Gachot's second pre-qualifying success. Two tenths of a second slower in second place was Nicola Larini in the Osella, pre-qualifying for the third time this season. The other two to go through to the main qualifying sessions were the Brabham pairing of Stefano Modena and Martin Brundle. This was the team's last pre-qualifying session of the season, as their five points in Monaco were enough to enable them to avoid having to pre-qualify for the rest of the season. Modena had pre-qualified at all eight events so far in 1989, and Brundle six, with both drivers qualifying for all of those races. 

Stefan Johansson narrowly missed out in fifth place in the second Onyx, his fourth failure this season. Alex Caffi was sixth in the Dallara, only his second failure, but Dallara were another team who would avoid pre-qualifying for the rest of the season, having scored eight points.

Gregor Foitek was seventh in the sole EuroBrun, still only able to pre-qualify once this season, which was once more than Piercarlo Ghinzani, eighth in the second Osella. Ninth was Yannick Dalmas, who had replaced Joachim Winkelhock at AGS, and for the rest of the season, both AGS cars would have to take part in pre-qualifying sessions. The Zakspeed pairing of Bernd Schneider and Aguri Suzuki were tenth and twelfth, with no success at this stage since the first race of the season. Pierre-Henri Raphanel was eleventh in his Coloni, and from here on, both Colonis would have to take part in pre-qualifying. At the bottom of the time sheets was the Rial of Volker Weidler, his eighth consecutive failure to pre-qualify, but Christian Danner's three points at Phoenix meant both cars would avoid pre-qualifying for the rest of the season.

Pre-qualifying classification

Qualifying report
McLaren took control of qualifying with Ayrton Senna ahead of Alain Prost.

Derek Warwick returned after missing the French Grand Prix, qualifying 19th. Still in pain from his karting accident, he had a special seat fitted in his Arrows. Maurício Gugelmin qualified sixth, but his March developed a water-related problem moments before the race, forcing him to start from the pit lane.

Qualifying classification

Race

Race report
Prost beat Senna off the line, but the Brazilian was later on the brakes and re-took the lead going into Copse Corner. They were followed by the Ferraris of Nigel Mansell and Gerhard Berger. At the end of lap 4, Berger pulled into the pits with electrical problems, rejoining the race some laps later. On lap 5 the race order was Senna, Prost, Mansell, the Williams pair of Thierry Boutsen and Riccardo Patrese, and Alessandro Nannini in the Benetton.

Senna spun out on lap 12 going into Becketts due to gear selection problems, handing Prost the lead from Mansell. Patrese overtook teammate Boutsen for third, before suffering a huge accident on lap 20 when a burst radiator sprayed water onto his rear wheels, causing him to spin off into the tyre barrier at Club Corner. With Prost and Mansell pulling away, Nelson Piquet moved into third in his Lotus on lap 23, ahead of Boutsen, Philippe Alliot in the Larrousse-Lola and Jean Alesi in the Tyrrell. Boutsen dropped back with a rear puncture while Alesi spun off at Club Corner on lap 29, at which point Prost led Mansell by 3.2 seconds, followed by Piquet, Nannini, Gugelmin and Alliot.

Alliot retired with an engine failure on lap 40. On lap 42, Mansell developed a puncture on his right front tyre, forcing him to pit. Prost was then delayed during his own pit stop for fresh tyres, but retained a healthy lead over Mansell. Gugelmin retired from fifth with a gearbox failure on lap 55, before Nannini passed Piquet for third on lap 56, pulling away in the closing laps.

At the chequered flag, Prost was 19 seconds ahead of Mansell, with Nannini a further 29 seconds back and Piquet the last driver on the lead lap. The Minardis of Pierluigi Martini and Luis Pérez-Sala finished fifth and sixth, scoring three points which prevented the team from being relegated to the pre-qualifying sessions for the second half of 1989 (and kept the Onyx team in these sessions, despite their two points for Stefan Johansson's fifth place at the previous race in France). This was Sala's only point in Formula One.

Race classification

Championship standings after the race

Drivers' Championship standings

Constructors' Championship standings

References

British Grand Prix
British Grand Prix
Grand Prix
British Grand Prix